Birge Katharina Huisgen-Zimmermann is a mathematician at University of California, Santa Barbara specializing in representation theory and ring theory.

Life and career
Huisgen-Zimmerman was born in Germany. Her father was the chemistry professor Rolf Huisgen. She received her Ph.D. from Ludwig-Maximilians-Universität München in 1974 under the supervision of Friedrich Kasch.  Huisgen-Zimmerman received her habilitation from Technical University of Munich in 1979, and stayed on the faculty at the Technical University of Munich until 1981. She became a researcher at the Deutsche Forschungsgemeinschaft, a faculty member at the University of Iowa, and a professor with a personal chair at the University of Passau, before moving to Santa Barbara in 1987.

Awards and honors

In 2012, Huisgen-Zimmerman became a fellow of the American Mathematical Society.

Selected publications
 Zimmermann-Huisgen, Birge: Pure submodules of direct products of free modules. Math. Ann. 224 (1976), no. 3, 233–245. 
 Zimmermann-Huisgen, Birge; Zimmermann, Wolfgang: On the sparsity of representations of rings of pure global dimension zero. Trans. Amer. Math. Soc. 320 (1990), no. 2, 695–711. 
 Zimmermann-Huisgen, Birge: Homological domino effects and the first finitistic dimension conjecture. Invent. Math. 108 (1992), no. 2, 369–383.
 Eklof, Paul C.; Huisgen-Zimmermann, Birge; Shelah, Saharon: Torsion modules, lattices and P-points.  Bull. London Math. Soc. 29 (1997), no. 5, 547–555.
  Huisgen-Zimmermann, Birge: Purity, algebraic compactness, direct sum decompositions, and representation type. Infinite length modules (Bielefeld, 1998), 331–367, Trends Math., Birkhäuser, Basel, 2000.

References

Living people
1946 births
American women mathematicians
20th-century American mathematicians
21st-century American mathematicians
Academic staff of the Technical University of Munich
University of Iowa faculty
Academic staff of the University of Passau
University of California, Santa Barbara faculty
Fellows of the American Mathematical Society
20th-century women mathematicians
21st-century women mathematicians
20th-century American women
21st-century American women